Chaetocnema is a genus of flea beetles in the family Chrysomelidae. There are some 470 described species worldwide.

Selected species

References

External links

 

Alticini
Chrysomelidae genera
Taxa named by James Francis Stephens